Maldivian FA Charity Shield (currently known as Milo Charity Shield due to sponsorship reasons) is a newly introduced match that was founded in 2009. Dhivehi League Champions and FA Cup Champions of the past season will play in this match. The winner of the match will be granted with a cash prize, where 20% of the total amount will be donated to a social working organization.

Matches
Below is a list of the Charity Shield winners. If one team wins the domestic double, then league runners-up are invited as the second team.

Winners

By number of wins

All time scores

Scorers

Main sponsors

Notes

References

External links

Charity Shield at FA Maldives.com

 
Maldives
Football competitions in the Maldives